An impulse vector is a mathematical tool to graphically design and analyze input shapers that could suppress residual vibration. The impulse vector can be applied for both undamped and underdamped systems, and for both positive and negative impulses in a unified way. The impulse vector makes it easy to obtain impulse time and magnitude of the input shaper graphically. 
A vector concept for an input shaper was first introduced by W. Singhose for undamped systems with positive impulses, and an impulse vector was first introduced by C.-G. Kang to generalize Singhose idea to underdamped systems with positive and negative impulses.

Definition 

For a vibratory second-order system  with undamped natural frequency  and damping ratio , the magnitude  and angle  of an impulse vector  corresponding to an impulse function ,   is defined in a 2-dimensional polar coordinate system as

where  implies the magnitude of an impulse function,  implies the time location of the impulse function, and  implies damped natural frequency .

Representing more than two impulse vectors in the same polar coordinate system makes an impulse vector diagram. The impulse vector diagram is a graphical representation of an impulse sequence.

Impulse vectors satisfy the commutative and associative laws, as well as the distributive law for scalar multiplication. 

The magnitude of the impulse vector determines the magnitude of the impulse, and the angle of the impulse vector determines the time location of the impulse. One rotation,  angle, on an impulse vector diagram corresponds to one (damped) period of the corresponding impulse response. 

Properties

Property 1: Resultant of two impulse vectors.  

The impulse response of a second-order system corresponding to the resultant of two impulse vectors is same as the time response of the system with a two-impulse input corresponding to two impulse vectors after the final impulse time regardless of whether the system is undamped or underdamped. □

Property 2: Zero resultant of impulse vectors. 

If the resultant of impulse vectors is zero, the time response of a second-order system for the input of the impulse sequence corresponding to the impulse vectors becomes zero also after the final impulse time regardless of whether the system is undamped or underdamped. □

Consider an underdamped second-order system with the transfer function .

The resultants ,  can be found as follows.

,

Note that .

Now, place an impulse vector  on the impulse vector diagram to cancel the resultant  as shown in the figure. The impulse vector  is given by

.

Of course, another canceling vector  can exist, which is the impulse vector with the same magnitude as  but with an opposite arrow direction.

Applications: Design of input shapers using impulse vectors

ZVDn shaper 
Using impulse vectors, we can redesign known input shapers  such as zero vibration (ZV), zero vibration and derivative (ZVD), and ZVDn shapers. 
Then from the impulse vector diagram of the ZV shaper on the right-hand side,

	 
.

Therefore, .

.

Therefoere, .

Thus, the ZV shaper  is given by

.

Then . From the impulse vector diagram,

.

Therefore, .

Also from the impulse vector diagram,

.

Since  must be hold,

.

Therefore, .

Thus, the ZVD shaper   is given by

.

Then . From the impulse vector diagram,

.

Therefore, . 

Also, from the impulse vector diagram,

.

Since  must be hold,

.

Therefore, .

Thus, the ZVD2 shaper  is given by

.

In general, for the ZVDn shaper, i-th impulse vector is located at  rad, and the magnitude ratio is  where  implies a mathematical combination.

ETM shaper 

Now, consider equal shaping-time and magnitudes (ETM) shapers, with the same magnitude of impulse vectors and with the same angle between impulse vectors. The ETMn shaper satisfies the conditions

.

Thus, the resultant of the impulse vectors of the ETMn shaper becomes always zero for all . One merit of the ETMn shaper is that, unlike the ZVDn or extra insensitive (EI) shapers, the shaping time is always one (damped) period of the time response even if n increases. 
The ETM4 shaper with four impulse vectors is obtained from the above conditions together with impulse vector definitions as

.

.

The ETM5 shaper with five impulse vectors is obtained similarly as

.

.

In the same way, the ETMn shaper with  can be obtained easily. In general, ETM shapers are less sensitive to modeling errors than ZVDn shapers in a large positive error range.

NMe shaper 

Moreover, impulse vectors can be applied to design input shapers with negative impulses. Then the resultant of three impulse vectors becomes zero, and thus the residual vibration is suppressed.

.

The resulting NMe shaper  is

.

.

The NMe shaper has faster rise time than the ZVD shaper, but it is more sensitive to modeling error than the ZVD shaper. Note that the NMe shaper is the same with the UM shaper if the system is undamped.

Figure (a) in the right side shows a typical block diagram of an input-shaping control system, and figure (b) shows residual vibration suppressions in unit-step responses by ZV, ZVD, ETM4 and NMe shapers.

References 

Dynamics (mechanics)

Control theory
Mechanical vibrations